The Lair is an American gay-themed vampire television series produced by here! in 2007. The first season consisted of six episodes and wrapped production in January 2007. The first two episodes premiered on June 1, 2007. Season 2 consisted of nine episodes and debuted on September 5, 2008. A third season of 13 episodes was announced in September 2008 and Colton Ford confirmed that filming took place in October and November 2008. Season 3 premiered September 4, 2009.

Cast

Main
 Peter Stickles as Damian Courtenay, leader of a vampire coven and owner of The Lair
 David Moretti as Thom Etherton, reporter for a local newspaper
 Dylan Vox as Colin, Damian's second in command
 Brian Nolan as Frankie, The Lair's human janitor
 Colton Ford as Sheriff Trout, the island's sheriff
 Jesse Cutlip as Jonathan, Thom's overly jealous boyfriend (season 1)
 Beverly Lynne as Laura Rivers, Thom's best friend and co-worker (seasons 1–2)
 Matty Ferraro as Ian, a young werewolf (season 2)
 Frankie Valenti as Tim, a landscaper and botanist's assistant (seasons 2–3)
 Steven Hirschi as Athan, an ancient Gorgon (season 3)

Also starring
In season three select actors had their names included in the opening credits directly after the main cast members' names, although no montage was made for them
 Thor Knai as Dennis, a troubled youth who was straightened out by Sheriff Trout
 Jared Grey as Harris Phillip Chichester, owner of the Seen Of The Crime Bookstore and author of two books on local legends
 Vince Harrington as Matty, manager of the Arkham Harbor Light bar
 Tyler Saint as an unnamed member of Damian's coven

Special guest stars
In season three select actors had their names included in the opening credits as special guest stars, although no montage was made for them
 Sybil Danning as Frau Von Hess, a vampire who wants revenge on Damian
 Ron Jeremy as a Delivery Guy, delivering to the Arkham Harbor Light bar

Notes

Plot summary

Season 1
The Lair is set in a small island community, the exact location of which is unknown. Thom, a reporter for the local paper, is investigating a string of deaths of young men, known as the "John Doe murders". His investigation leads him to a sex club called The Lair, which he discovers is run by a coven of vampires led by Damian. Damian is drawn to Thom because Thom is the double of the man who turned Damian into a vampire two centuries earlier. Colin, Damian's lieutenant, schemes to brick Damian behind a wall and take over The Lair. Local lawman Sheriff Trout, also investigating the murders, finds his way to The Lair. A shootout ensues in which Damian's human henchman Frankie is killed.

Season 2
As Sheriff Trout recovers from his gunshot wounds, he takes in Ian, a new arrival to the island who is pursued by a mysterious mainlander. Damian contacts Thom and convinces him to recover Damian's body and restore him. Frankie haunts Colin, warning of his imminent demise. Intrigue blooms in the form of the Lumina Orchis, a flower that blossoms only in moonlight and which casts a strange fascination over local botanist Jake to the dismay of his assistant Tim. By season's end Jake, Laura, Jonathan and the mysterious mainlander are all dead, Colin is destroyed and Thom is living at The Lair.

Season 2.5
Season 2.5 was depicted in an online 8-part comic series drawn by comic artist Rosendo Brown, known for Fabulance.  Each part in the series was a one-page stand-alone story that was meant to fill in the missing links of events that transpired after the Season 2 finale.  These stories were:

 "A Cold Day in Hell":  Colin arrives in Hell and learns that he must make a deal with the devil to return to his immortal, vampire life.
 "Special Delivery":  Damian indulges in deviant sexual behavior with one of his vampire coven as he ruminates on his life as the undead king.
 "Bump in the Night":  Sheriff Trout keeps watch on a sleepless night at his house, guarding against the unseen terrors that have suddenly plagued his town.
 "Highway to Hell":  Colin is given directions by the demon on where he can find The Master, who will return Colin to Earth.
 "A Warm Welcome": Colin fights a demon guardian on his quest to find the elusive "Master"
 "Ghost Stories":  Frankie learns the bright side of being a ghost from the spirit of a dead little boy.
 "Last Call":  Thom starts to lament the choices in his life as he is accosted by a blood thirsty vampire in Damian's club.   
 "A Chance in Hell": The Master puts his plan into motion by agreeing to return Colin to the world of the living

Season 3
Thom struggles to adjust to life as the only human at The Lair. Colin enthralls Richie from beyond the grave to restore Colin, who schemes to establish a club to rival The Lair. Damian is contacted by the reclusive Frau von Hess, who has plans for him and the island. Sheriff Trout, missing the now-fugitive Ian, recalls another young man from his past. A new arrival to the island is Athan, an antiquities expert who harbors within him the spirit of a male gorgon.

Podcast
On June 21, 2007, here! launched a podcast for the series. Hosted by DJ and here! personality Ben Harvey, the podcast features roundtable discussions of the series and interviews with cast members. No new podcasts associated with season two have been released; the last podcast was released in October 2007.

Critical response
Critical reaction to The Lair has been largely negative. "Awful...in a general sense [but with] true camp value" is how the Pittsburgh Post-Gazette described the show. While the Post-Gazette singles out Moretti's performance for praise, other reviews describe various of the cast as "wooden" and the acting "so amateurishly done as to be comical at times."

DVD releases

See also
Vampire film
List of vampire television series

References

External links
 Official site
 

2007 American television series debuts
2000s American LGBT-related drama television series
American television soap operas
Gay-related television shows
Here TV original programming
2000s American horror television series
Vampires in television
Gay-related films